The Switzerland national under-21 football team is the national under-21 football team of Switzerland and is controlled by the Swiss Football Association. The team competes in the UEFA European Under-21 Football Championship, held every two years.

UEFA U-23 championship record 
Since the under-21 competition rules insist that players must be 21 or under at the start of a two-year competition, technically it is an U-23 competition. For this reason, Switzerland's record in the preceding U-23 competitions is also shown.
 1972: Did not qualify. Finished 2nd of 2 in qualification group
 1974: Did not enter
 1976: Did not enter

UEFA U-21 Championship record 

*Denotes draws including knockout matches decided on penalty kicks.

Coaches
 1995–2001:  Köbi Kuhn
 2001–2007:  Bernard Challandes
 2007–2009:  Pierre-André Schürmann
 2009–2015:  Pierluigi Tami
 2015–2018:  Heinz Moser
 2018–2022:  Mauro Lustrinelli

Current squad
 The following players were called up for the 2023 UEFA European Under-21 Championship qualification matches.
 Match dates: 4 and 8 June 2022
 Opposition:  and 
 Caps and goals correct as of: 4 June 2022, after the match against 
 Names in italics denote players who have been capped for the senior team

Swiss national teams
 Switzerland national football team
 Switzerland national under-23 football team (also known as Swiss Olympic)
 Switzerland national under-20 football team
 Switzerland national under-19 football team
 Switzerland national under-18 football team
 Switzerland national under-17 football team
 Switzerland national under-16 football team

See also 
 UEFA European Under-21 Football Championship

Footnotes

Sources/external links 
 UEFA Under-21 website - contains full results archive
 The Rec.Sport.Soccer Statistics Foundation - contains full record of U-21/U-23 Championships

 
European national under-21 association football teams